The Tablelands Region is a local government area in Far North Queensland, Australia inland from the city of Cairns. Established in 2008, it was preceded by four previous local government areas which dated back more than a century. On 1 January 2014, one of those local government areas, the Shire of Mareeba, was re-established independent of the Tablelands Region.

It has an estimated operating budget of A$62.2 million.

History 
Yidinji (also known as Yidinj, Yidiny, and Idindji) is an Australian Aboriginal language. Its traditional language region is within the local government areas of Cairns Region and Tablelands Region, in such localities as Cairns, Gordonvale, and the Mulgrave River, and the southern part of the Atherton Tableland including Atherton and Kairi.

Prior to the 2008 amalgamation, the Tablelands Region consisted the entire area of four previous local government areas:

 the Shire of Atherton;
 the Shire of Eacham;
 the Shire of Herberton; and
 the Shire of Mareeba.

On 11 November 1879, when the Divisional Boards Act 1879 came into effect proclaiming 74 divisions around Queensland, the nature and distribution of the population in the Tablelands region was vastly different from today. Most of the area was divided between the Hinchinbrook and Woothakata divisions. On 3 September 1881, Tinaroo Division was proclaimed from part of Hinchinbrook, making the mining towns of Tinaroo and Thornborough the administrative centres of the region.

A number of changes occurred from that point:

 15 September 1888 – Formation of the Borough of Herberton to manage the town of Herberton
 14 May 1889 – Walsh Division (Irvinebank) separated from Woothakata
 20 December 1890 – Barron Division separated from Tinaroo
 11 May 1895 – Herberton Division separated from Tinaroo; amalgamated the Borough
 31 March 1903 – Under the Local Authorities Act 1902, Barron, Herberton, Tinaroo, Walsh and Woothakata became Shires.
 16 December 1908 – Shire of Chillagoe formed from part of Woothakata
 18 November 1910 – Shire of Eacham formed from part of Tinaroo
 20 December 1919 – Shire of Barron abolished and divided between Mulgrave and Woothakata
 1933 – Shires of Walsh and Chillagoe amalgamated into Woothakata
 1935 – Shire of Tinaroo renamed Shire of Atherton
 20 December 1947 – Shire of Woothakata renamed Shire of Mareeba

In July 2007, the Local Government Reform Commission released its report and recommended that the four areas amalgamate. Amongst its reasons given for this recommendation were that a community of interest revolved around the towns of Mareeba and Atherton, with residents travelling to Cairns for services not offered in the region. The opportunity for tourism and leisure promotion under a single banner, the close proximity of most major towns, the lack of natural barriers and similar economic interests including beef, dairy, fruit and sugar production. All councils opposed the amalgamation, although Atherton, Herberton and Eacham were willing to consider shared service delivery.

In 2012, a proposal was made to de-amalgamate the Shire of Mareeba from the Tablelands Region. On 9 March 2013, the citizens of the former Mareeba shire voted in a referendum to de-amalgamate. The Shire of Mareeba was re-established on 1 January 2014.

Wards and councillors

Tablelands Regional Council consists of:
 Mayor: Rodney Donald (Rod) Marti
 Division 1 Councillor: Kevin Cardew
 Division 2 Councillor: Annette Haydon
 Division 3 Councillor: Dave Bilney
 Division 4 Councillor: David Clifton
 Division 5 Councillor: Peter Hodge
 Division 6 Councillor: Bernie Wilce

Mayors 
 2008–2012: Tom Gilmore
 2012–2016: Rosa Lee Long
 2016–2020: Joe Paronella
 2020–present: Rod Marti

Towns and localities 
The Tablelands Region includes the following settlements:

Atherton area:
 Atherton
 Barrine
 Carrington
 Kairi
 Lake Tinaroo
 Tinaroo
 Tolga
 Upper Barron
 Walkamin
 Wongabel

Eacham area:
 Malanda
 Yungaburra
 Butchers Creek
 Glen Allyn
 Jaggan
 Lake Eacham
 Maalan
 Millaa Millaa
 North Johnstone
 Palmerston1
 Peeramon
 Tarzali

Herberton area:
 Herberton
 Evelyn
 Innot Hot Springs
 Kalunga
 Millstream
 Moomin
 Mount Garnet
 Ravenshoe
 Tumoulin
 Wairuna
 Wondecla

Others:
 Beatrice
 Danbulla
 East Barron
 Ellinjaa
 Gadgarra
 Glen Ruth
 Gunnawarra
 Kaban
 Kingsborough
 Kirrama
 Koombooloomba
 Kureen
 Lake Barrine
 Middlebrook
 Minbun
 Minnamoolka
 Moregatta
 Mungalli
 Silver Valley
 Topaz
 Wooroonooran2

1 - shared with Cassowary Coast Region
2 - shared with Cairns Region and Cassowary Coast Region

Population
The populations given relate to the component entities prior to 2008.

Libraries 
The Tablelands Regional Council operate public libraries in Atherton, Herberton, Malanda, Millaa Millaa, Mount Garnet, Ravenshoe and Yungaburra.

References

 
Tablelands
Far North Queensland
2008 establishments in Australia